The Renfe Class 310 is a class of 60 four axle Bo'Bo' diesel-electric locomotives for shunting and freight built by Meinfesa with General Motors Electromotive Division components (engine, electrical transmission).

In the mid-2000s 4 units were converted to a subclass 310.1; a push-pull container train with a 310 class locomotive at each end; the units later became the property of Ferrocarrils de la Generalitat de Catalunya (FGC) and became the 353 Series.

History and design

The Renfe 310 was ordered in the late 1980s as a replacement for the Renfe Class 307 and 308. The order was part of a modernisation of the diesel shunting fleet in the 1980s which also resulted in the Renfe Class 309 and 311. The 310 Class is a variant of the General Motors SW1001 switcher with a modified cab shape.

The locomotives were painted in the standard silver and red livery standard for Renfe shunting locomotives.

As of 2010 the class are split between Adif and Renfe Mercancías.

Class 310.1

Each train consists of 8  wagons and a class 310 locomotive at either end, with a container capacity of 24 TEU. The locomotives are connected by optical fibre.

The 310.1 locomotives received modified cabs, similar to the design of the rebuilt Renfe 333.3 subclass.

Later the two sets were sold to FGC and in 2009 began use transporting car parts to a SEAT factory. Under FGC ownership the units became the class FGC 353.

See also
EMD SW1001 General Motors switcher locomotive, and basis of the class 310 design

Notes

References

Literature
 Enguix i Peiro, Joan Carles : Las nuevas locomotoras 310, in Carril n° 30, 06/1990
 Galan Eruste, Manuel : Mercancias regionales : TMD. In Maquetren n° 125, 08/2003
 Gutiérrez Ruiz, Antonio : Serie 310 : Metamorfosis, in Maquetren n° 130, 01/2004

Railway locomotives introduced in 1989
310
Macosa/Meinfesa/Vossloh Espana locomotives
Electro-Motive Diesel locomotives
5 ft 6 in gauge locomotives
Diesel-electric locomotives of Spain